Pedda Avutapale railway station (station code:PAVP) is an Indian Railways station in Peda Avutapalle village of Andhra Pradesh. It lies on the Vijayawada–Nidadavolu loop line of Howrah–Chennai main line and is administered under Vijayawada railway division of South Central Railway zone. Eight trains halt at the station each day.

History
Between 1893 and 1896,  of the East Coast State Railway, between Vijayawada and Cuttack, was opened for traffic. The southern part of the East Coast State Railway (from Waltair to Vijayawada) was taken over by Madras Railway in 1901.

Electrification
The Mustabad–Gannavaram–Nuzvid–Bhimadolu sector was electrified in 1995–96.

Classification 
Peda Avutapalle railway station is categorized as a Non-Suburban Grade-6 (NSG-6) station in the Vijayawada railway division.

References

External links
South Central Railway

Railway stations in Krishna district
Vijayawada railway division
1893 establishments in India